The Symphonies of Wind Instruments (French title: Symphonies d'instruments à vent) is a concert work written by Igor Stravinsky in 1920, for an ensemble of woodwind and brass instruments.  The piece is in one movement, lasting about 9 minutes.  It is dedicated to the memory of Claude Debussy, who died in 1918, and was premiered in London on 10 June 1921, conducted by Serge Koussevitzky.

A piano reduction by Arthur Lourié was published in 1926, a full score appearing only after Stravinsky re-orchestrated the work in 1947.

Instrumentation
The Symphonies was originally scored for an ensemble of 24 wind instruments: 3 flutes (3rd doubling piccolo), alto flute, 2 oboes, English horn, 2 clarinets, “alto clarinet in F” (commonly known as a basset horn), 3 bassoons (3rd doubling contrabassoon), 4 horns, 3 trumpets, 3 trombones, and tuba. The 1947 revision requires 23 players: 3 flutes, 2 oboes, English horn, 3 clarinets, 3 bassoons (3rd doubling contrabassoon), 4 horns, 3 trumpets, 3 trombones, and tuba.

Analysis
In the title of this piece, Stravinsky used the word "symphonies" (note the plural form) not to label the work as an essay in the  symphonic form, but rather in the word's older, broader connotation, from the Greek, of "sounding together". The music of the Symphonies draws on Russian folk elements, and is constructed of "contrasting episodes at three different yet related tempos".

The chorale which concludes the piece was originally published in the magazine La Revue musicale in an edition entitled Le Tombeau de Claude Debussy, which included short pieces from several composers, including Maurice Ravel and Manuel de Falla, dedicated to Debussy's memory. It appeared as a piano score in the Tombeau.

Reception
The premiere at Queen's Hall, London, was greeted initially by laughter and derision from an audience unaccustomed to Stravinsky's experimental work. According to Arthur Rubinstein, who attended the performance with Stravinsky, laughter broke out during the bassoon segment, and the conductor, Koussevitzky, "instead of stopping the performance and addressing the audience with a few words, assuring them that it was a serious work in the modern idiom, smiled maliciously and even had a twinkle in his eye as he looked over his shoulder at the laughing audience". A reviewer for the Times reported, however, that the hisses "were no sign of ill-will towards the composer", and subsided when Stravinsky stood up at the end of the performance to bow.

References

Sources

 
 {{wikicite|ref=|reference=Freed, Richard. 2006. About the Composition:  Symphonies of Wind Instruments (original 1920 version) (program note written for performances by the National Symphony Orchestra in Washington DC).}}
 
 
 
 

Further reading

 Cone, Edward T. 1962. "Stravinsky: The Progress of a Method". Perspectives of New Music 1, no. 1 (Fall): 18–26. Reprinted in Perspectives on Schoenberg and Stravinsky, edited by Benjamin Boretz and Edward T. Cone (Princeton: Princeton University Press, 1968; reissued New York: W. W. Norton, 1972): 155–164. Also reprinted in Edward T. Cone, Music: A View from Delft (Chicago: University of Chicago Press, 1989): 293–301.
 Craft, Robert. 1983–84. "A. On the Symphonies of Wind Instruments. B. Toward Corrected Editions of the Sonata, Serenade, and Concerto for Two Pianos. C. The Chronology of the Octet". Perspectives of New Music 22, nos. 1 & 2:448–463.
 Gubernikoff, Carole. 2000. "Stravinsky: Symphonies d'instruments à vent". In Anais do I Seminário Nacional de Pesquisa em Performance Musical. I, edited by André Cavazotti and Fausto Borém. [Brazil]: Multimídia. (CD-ROM publication.)
 Hascher, Xavier. 2003. "De l'harmonie au timbre, vers une harmonie de timbres: L'exemple de Stravinsky". Analyse Musicale, no. 48 (September): 83–98.
 Kramer, Jonathan D. 1978. "Moment Form in Twentieth-Century Music". The Musical Quarterly 64, no. 2 (April): 177–195.
 Randel, Don. 1986. The New Harvard Dictionary of Music. Cambridge:  Belknap Press. . (p. 822 and 825).
 Rehding, Alexander. 1998. "Towards a 'Logic of Discontinuity' in Stravinsky's Symphonies of Wind Instruments: Hasty, Kramer, and Straus Reconsidered". Music Analysis 17, no. 1 (March): 39–65.
 Somfai, Lászlo. 1972. "Symphonies of Wind Instruments (1920). Observations on Stravinsky's Organic Construction". Studia Musicologica Academiae Scientiarum Hungaricae 14, fasc. 1/4: 355–383.
 Straus, Joseph N. 1982. "A Principle of Voice Leading in the Music of Stravinsky". Music Theory Spectrum: The Journal of the Society for Music Theory 4:106–124.
 Stravinsky, Igor. 1991. Symphonies d'instruments à vent: Faksimileausgabe des Particells und der Partitur der Erstfassung (1920), edited and with a commentary by André Baltensperger and Felix Meyer. Winterthur: Amadeus Verlag. .
 Taruskin, Richard. 1993. "Review: Igor Stravinsky. Symphonies d'instruments à vent: Faksimileausgabe des Particells und der Partitur der Erstfassung (1920)". Notes, Second Series 49, No. 4 (June): 1617–1621.
 Van den Toorn, Pieter C. 1998. "Metrical Displacement in Stravinsky". Mitteilungen der Paul Sacher Stiftung, no. 11 (April): 24–28.
 Walsh, Stephen. 1996. "Stravinsky's Symphonies: Accident or Design?" In Analytical Strategies and Musical Interpretation: Essays on Nineteenth- and Twentieth-Century Music, edited by Craig Ayrey and Mark Everist, 35–71. New York: Cambridge University Press. 
 Wason, Robert W. 1994. "Toward a Critical Edition of Stravinsky's Symphonies of Wind Instruments". In The Wind Ensemble and Its Repertoire: Essays on the Fortieth Anniversary of the Eastman Wind Ensemble, edited by Frank J. Cipolla and Donald Hunsberger, 121–140. Rochester: University of Rochester.
 Yuzefovich, Victor, and Marina Kostalevsky. 2002. "Chronicle of a Non-Friendship: Letters of Stravinsky and Koussevitzky". The Musical Quarterly'' 86, no. 4 (Winter): 750–885.

Compositions by Igor Stravinsky
1920 compositions